This is a list of past and present members of the Senate of Canada representing the province of British Columbia.

Under the British Columbia Terms of Union, 1871, the province was originally represented by three senators. The Constitution Act of 1915 increased British Columbia by three seats, to its current number of six.

The Constitution Act of 1915 also amended Section 26 of the Constitution Act of 1867 to add a fourth regional division, called the Western Provinces, made up of British Columbia, Alberta, Saskatchewan and Manitoba, to allow two senators to be appointed on a regional basis.

Current

Notes:

1 Senators are appointed to represent British Columbia. Each senator may choose to designate a geographic area within the province as his or her division.
2 Senators are appointed by the Governor-General of Canada on the recommendation of the prime minister.

Historical

Notes:

1 Senators are appointed to represent British Columbia. Each senator may choose to designate a geographic area within the province as his or her division.
2 Senators are appointed by the Governor-General of Canada on the recommendation of the prime minister.

Western provinces regional senators
Senators listed were appointed to represent the Western Provinces under section 26 of the Constitution Act. This clause has only been used once before to appoint two extra senators to represent four regional Senate divisions: Ontario, Quebec, the Maritimes and the Western Provinces.

As vacancies open up among the normal members of the Senate, they are automatically filled by the regional senators. Regional senators may also designate themselves to a senate division in any province of their choosing in their region.

Notes:

1 Party listed was the last party of which the senator was a member.
2 Senators are appointed to represent their region. Each senator may choose to designate a geographic area within their region as his or her division.
3 Senators are appointed by the Governor-General of Canada on the recommendation of the prime minister.

See also
Lists of Canadian senators

External links
Current Senators List Parliament Website

 
British Columbia
Senators